Trichiura is a genus of moths in the family Lasiocampidae. The genus was described by Stephens in 1928.

Species
Trichiura crataegi (Linnaeus, 1758) - pale oak eggar
Trichiura castiliana (Spuler, 1908)
Trichiura ilicis (Rambur, 1858)
Trichiura mirzayani
Trichiura verenae Witt, 1981

References

External links
Fauna Europaea

Lasiocampidae